Dear Comrades! is a 2020 Russian historical drama film about the Novocherkassk massacre produced, co-written and directed by Andrei Konchalovsky. It was entered in competition at the 77th Venice International Film Festival. At Venice, the film won the Special Jury Prize. The film received a nomination for BAFTA Award for Best Film Not in the English Language and was selected as the Russian entry for the Best International Feature Film at the 93rd Academy Awards, making the shortlist of fifteen films.

Plot 
The film tells about the shooting of a demonstration of workers in Novocherkassk in 1962. Lyudmila is a party worker of the local city committee, and a staunch communist. During a large workers' strike at the Novocherkassk Electric Locomotive Plant over rising food prices and cuts in wages, Lyudmila witnesses the mass shooting of demonstrators by order of the Government Commission, which is trying to hide the strike from the rest of the USSR. 

During the protest and massacre, Lyudmila's 18-year-old daughter Svetka disappears. Lyudmila searches for her daughter frantically, but discreetly, as the KGB begins arresting suspects, secretly burying bodies, locking the town down completely, and legally swearing every person in town to total silence about the events. Lyudmila struggles to understand how the government could do all this, but also tries to convince herself that communism will triumph in the end. She longs for the days when Stalin ruled, but also prays and begs God to let her daughter still be alive.

A sympathetic KGB agent surreptitiously tries to help her locate her daughter. They eventually make their way out of the town to check a rural cemetery where some of the bodies have been secretly buried. A policeman who was ordered to bury the bodies in decrepit graves confirms that he buried the girl in the picture Lyudmila shows him of her daughter Svetka. She becomes grief-stricken when he mentions the girl's toes were sticking out of a hole in one stocking - a hole Lyudmila had recently told her daughter to sew up.

She drinks heavily on the way back to town. She is overcome with grief and confusion about all that has happened and what it means for communism and for her life. When she gets back to her apartment at night, her own father is packing up Svetka's suitcase. He tells Lyudmila that Svetka is up on the roof.

Lyudmila races up the stairs, and through a window sees her daughter hiding on the roof. She is overcome with joy and shock and repeats God's name in wonder that her daughter is alive.  As she hugs Svetka, she promises that she will protect her from the KGB. As the film ends, Lyudmila embraces her daughter and repeats the words, "We'll do better."

Cast 
 Julia Vysotskaya as Lyudmila 'Lyuda' Syomina
 Sergei Erlish as Lyuda's father
 Yuliya Burova as Svetka, Lyuda's daughter
 Vladislav Komarov as Loginov
 Andrey Gusev as Viktor

Reception
Review aggregator Rotten Tomatoes gives the film 93% approval rating based on 58 reviews, with an average rating of 8.1/10. The website's critics consensus reads: "Dear Comrades takes a sharp, commanding look at a dark chapter in Soviet history made even more effective by its director's cold fury." According to Metacritic, which sampled 19 critics and calculated a weighted average score of 82 out of 100, the film received "universal acclaim".

See also
 List of submissions to the 93rd Academy Awards for Best International Feature Film
 List of Russian submissions for the Academy Award for Best International Feature Film

References

External links
 

2020 films
2020 drama films
2020s historical drama films
Russian black-and-white films
Russian historical drama films
2020s Russian-language films
Drama films based on actual events
Films about Soviet repression
Films directed by Andrei Konchalovsky
Films set in 1962
Films set in Russia
Films set in the Soviet Union
Venice Special Jury Prize winners
Films about communism
Films critical of communism